Doga Sharif (ڈوگہ شریف) is a village  Gujrat District of Punjab, Pakistan. It is situated on the Bhimber Road, located at 32°43'42"N 74°4'37"E and is the second largest village of Tehsil Gujrat. A large pond is also situated by the main entrance of village. Doga Sharif is most famous due to shrine of Peer Abul Kamal Barq Shah Naushahi r.a (1924-1985) and his beloved son Peer Safdar Shah Naushahi Shaheed r.a (1943-1981),the father of religious scholar Sahibzada Syed Zamir Shah

Education 
Doga Sharif has a High School for girls and boys inside the village and primary school for boys and many private schools.

The population of Doga Sharif is estimated to be 18,000. Natural gas has been discovered in this village. Doga has many communities Gujjar, Thalla, Mehar, Jat, Rajpoot and many others. The population is 99.99% Muslim with a Sunni majority with famous Naushahi Sufi Order Shrine of Peer Abul Kamal Shah Barq Naushahi and Peer Safdar Hussain Shah Naushahi. Agriculture is a profession of people of Doga. Small land holdings and no proper source of irrigation have forced people to look for alternatives. From then on till mid-1990s Middle East was the favorite destination for the workers. But now people from Doga are working and living in Europe, Middle East, mainly Greece, Italy, Spain, Saudi Arabia and UAE. Many are well settled and living with their families.

Villages in Gujrat District